Christinna Pedersen (born 12 May 1986) is a Danish badminton player.

Career 
Christinna Pedersen is a right-handed doubles specialist.

From 2008 onwards, Pedersen paired with Joachim Fischer Nielsen in mixed doubles. The pair gained two European mixed doubles titles, won bronze at the 2009 Hyderabad World Championships and at the 2014 World Championships, and came third at the 2012 Summer Olympics. Pedersen and Fischer Nielsen also produced strong results on the BWF Super Series circuit, winning a total of three World Superseries Finals and ten Superseries titles, and reaching a career high World Ranking of number 1.

Viewed by Badminton Denmark as a medal contender for the 2020 Olympics, Pedersen will compete in the mixed doubles with Mathias Christiansen as of the end of the 2016/17 season, after Joachim Fischer Nielsen broke his left ankle at the BWF World Championships 2017 in Glasgow.

In women's doubles, Pedersen has paired with Kamilla Rytter Juhl from 2010 to 2018. Initially, the two athletes also focussed on competing with their respective partners in mixed doubles, however, as of 2015, Juhl has competed exclusively in the women's doubles. The pair won a silver medal at the 2015 World Championships, and a bronze medal at the 2013 Guangzhou World Championship and at the 2017 BWF World Championships. Pedersen and Rytter Juhl have won a total of four European women's doubles titles, one World Superseries Final and five Superseries titles, and have a career highest World Ranking of number 2. The pair won a silver medal at the 2016 Rio Olympics and, in doing so, became the first Europeans to ever compete in an Olympic women's doubles final. This was also her second olympic medal.

Pedersen currently represents Skovshoved in the Danish Badminton League and lives in Copenhagen, where she trains with the national team. Off the badminton court, Pedersen is a qualified maths, history and food technology teacher.

Pedersen announced her retirement in March 2019 together with Rytter Juhl. The duo journey in badminton will continue in the national tournament.

Personal life
Pedersen is openly lesbian. She welcomed her first child with her partner Kamilla Rytter Juhl in January 2019.

Pedersen and Rytter Juhl's autobiography, "Det Unikke Makkerskab" (loosely translated: The unique partnership), written with support from journalist Rasmus M. Bech, was released in Denmark in October 2017. In the book, the couple tell not only of their lives as international badminton players, but of their life together off court; having been a couple since 2009.

Achievements

Olympic Games 
Women's doubles

Mixed doubles

BWF World Championships 
Women's doubles

Mixed doubles

European Championships 
Women's doubles

Mixed doubles

European Junior Championships 
Girls' doubles

Mixed doubles

BWF World Tour 
The BWF World Tour, which was announced on 19 March 2017 and implemented in 2018, is a series of elite badminton tournaments sanctioned by the Badminton World Federation (BWF). The BWF World Tour is divided into levels of World Tour Finals, Super 1000, Super 750, Super 500, Super 300 (part of the HSBC World Tour), and the BWF Tour Super 100.

Women's doubles

Mixed doubles

BWF Superseries 
The BWF Superseries, which was launched on 14 December 2006 and implemented in 2007, was a series of elite badminton tournaments, sanctioned by the Badminton World Federation (BWF). BWF Superseries levels were Superseries and Superseries Premier. A season of Superseries consisted of twelve tournaments around the world that had been introduced since 2011. Successful players were invited to the Superseries Finals, which were held at the end of each year.

Women's doubles

Mixed doubles

  BWF Superseries Finals tournament
  BWF Superseries Premier tournament
  BWF Superseries tournament

BWF Grand Prix 
The BWF Grand Prix had two levels, the Grand Prix and Grand Prix Gold. It was a series of badminton tournaments sanctioned by the Badminton World Federation (BWF) and played between 2007 and 2017.

Women's doubles

Mixed doubles

  BWF Grand Prix Gold tournament
  BWF Grand Prix tournament

BWF International Challenge/Series 
Women's doubles

Mixed doubles

  BWF International Challenge tournament
  BWF International Series/European Circuit tournament

References

External links 
 
 

1986 births
Living people
Sportspeople from Aalborg
Danish female badminton players
Badminton players at the 2016 Summer Olympics
Badminton players at the 2012 Summer Olympics
Olympic badminton players of Denmark
Olympic silver medalists for Denmark
Olympic bronze medalists for Denmark
Olympic medalists in badminton
Medalists at the 2012 Summer Olympics
Medalists at the 2016 Summer Olympics
World No. 1 badminton players
Danish LGBT sportspeople
Lesbian sportswomen
Danish lesbians
LGBT badminton players
21st-century Danish LGBT people